Lieutenant General Sir Gary Robert Coward,  (born 26 August 1955) is a retired senior British Army officer, who served as Chief of Materiél (Land) and Quartermaster-General to the Forces from September 2009 until his retirement in May 2012.

Military career
Coward was commissioned into the Royal Artillery in 1974, but transferred to the Army Air Corps in 1983. In 1995 he was deployed to the Bosnia and was appointed Officer of the Order of the British Empire for his service there. He provided daily briefings on television from Sarajevo during the conflict.

He was appointed Director of Equipment Capability at the Ministry of Defence in 2003, and then moved on to be Commander Joint Helicopter Command in 2005. In 2007 he moved on again to be Chief of Staff at Permanent Joint Headquarters in Northwood. He was appointed Companion of the Order of the Bath in the 2008 Queen's Birthday Honours.

In September 2009 he was made Chief of Materiel (Land) and Quartermaster-General.

He was appointed Knight Commander of the Order of the British Empire (KBE) in the 2012 Birthday Honours.

References

|-
 

1955 births
Living people
British Army lieutenant generals
Companions of the Order of the Bath
Knights Commander of the Order of the British Empire
Royal Artillery officers
British Army Air Corps officers
NATO personnel in the Bosnian War
People educated at the Duke of York's Royal Military School